Sanjappa is a genus of flowering plants in the family Fabaceae. The genus Sanjappa contains a single species, Sanjappa cynometroides, native to Southwestern India.

References

Mimosoids
Monotypic Fabaceae genera